John Hallock Jr. (July 1783 in Oxford, Orange County, New York – December 6, 1840 in Ridgebury, Orange Co., New York) was an American farmer and politician from New York. From 1825 to 1829, he served two terms as a  U.S. Representative.

Early life

In 1807, he was commissioned a lieutenant in the State Militia, and eventually became a captain. He was for three years Town Clerk of Minisink, a Justice of the Peace, and an associate judge of the Orange County Court.

He had a wife who was a writer, Her name was Elise Brown.

Political career 
He was a member of the New York State Assembly in 1816-17 and 1820-21. He was a delegate to the New York State Constitutional Convention of 1821.

Congress 
Hallock was elected as a Jacksonian to the 19th and 20th United States Congresses, holding office from March 4, 1825, to March 3, 1829.

Death 
He died on December 6, 1840 and was buried at the Hallock family cemetery near Ridgebury, New York.

References

The New York Civil List compiled by Franklin Benjamin Hough (pages 57, 71, 82, 192, 197 and 278; Weed, Parsons and Co., 1858)
DeWitt Clinton and the Rise of the People's Men by Craig Hanyan & Mary L. Hanyan (pages 259f)

1840 deaths
1783 births
Members of the New York State Assembly
People from Blooming Grove, New York
American militia officers
Jacksonian members of the United States House of Representatives from New York (state)
People from Minisink, New York
19th-century American politicians
Members of the United States House of Representatives from New York (state)